Solmssen is a family name and may refer to:

 Arthur R.G. Solmssen (1928–2018), American lawyer and novelist
 Georg Solmssen (1869–1957), German banker
 Peter York Solmssen (born 1955), American lawyer and business executive

See also
 Solmsen (disambiguation)